The  is an award handed out semiannually (from 2004–2009) and annually (since 2010) by the Japanese publisher ASCII Media Works (formerly MediaWorks) for original one-shot manga. Between the first and fifth contests held, there were two divisions: original and anthology. This was changed with the sixth contest to a Daioh/Gao! division which covered shōnen manga, and a Sylph division which covered shōjo manga. Between the seventh and twelfth contests, the two divisions were changed to simply shōnen and shōjo manga. Starting with the 13th contest in 2011, a seinen manga division was added. There are three types of prizes given out each contest: the Grand Prix Prize (2 million yen), the Semi-Grand Prix Prize (500,000 yen), and the Excellence Prize (300,000 yen). The Grand Prix Prize has only been handed out four times in the contest's history: in 2004, 2005, 2010 and 2012. There was also once a Dengeki Moeoh Grand Prize division which was held twice with a Grand Prize and Honorable Mentions.

Prize winners

2004–2010

2011–present

See also

 List of manga awards

References

External links
Dengeki Comic Grand Prix official website 

Manga awards
ASCII Media Works
Comics awards
MediaWorks (publisher)
One-shot manga